Calcific bursitis refers to calcium deposits within the bursae. This most occurs in the shoulder area. The most common bursa for calcific bursitis to occur is the subacromial bursa. A bursa is a small, fluid-filled sac that reduces friction, and facilitates movements between its adjacent tissues (i.e., between tendon and bone, two muscles or skin and bone). Inflammation of the bursae is called bursitis.

Signs and symptoms
 Pain during rest
 Tenderness on palpation
 Stiffness (reducing joint range of motion)
 Swelling

Causes
Calcific bursitis may be related to:
 Calcific tendinitis. Sometimes calcium deposits of the involved tendons penetrate into the bursae.
 Chronic bursitis. Lack of bursitis treatment or repetitive bursitis may lead to calcific bursitis.

Diagnosis
Diagnostic methods are the following
 X-ray
 MRI scan

Treatment
Management methods are the following
 Ice (in the acute stage)
 Rest (immobilization of the affected limb in the acute phase)
 Non steroidal anti-inflammatory drugs
 Injections of steroid
 Physical therapy
 Surgical treatment

See also
 Bursitis
 Calcific tendinitis

References
 Darlene Hertling and Randolph M.Kessler. Management of Common Musculoskeletal Disorders. Third Edition. 
 Calcific bursitis at MedicineNet

Soft tissue disorders
Synovial bursae